Nikkasauridae is a family of biarmosuchian therapsids. It contains two genera Nikkasaurus and Reiszia.

References

Biarmosuchians
Prehistoric therapsid families